Valgerður Sverrisdóttir (born 23 March 1950) is an Icelandic politician. She was a member of the Althing (Iceland's parliament) for the Progressive Party for the Northeast constituency starting in 1987 and was Chairman of the Progressive Party parliamentary group from 1995 to 1999, Minister of Industry and Commerce from 1999 to 2006, and Minister for Nordic Cooperation from 2004 to 2005. She was Minister for Foreign Affairs from 15 June 2006 to 24 May 2007. She has been a member of the Progressive Party's central committee since 1983.

Controversy

In 2006, Árni Finnsson, chairman of the Iceland Nature Conservation Association, accused Valgerður Sverrisdóttir of corruption for failing to reveal details of a report showing that the area on which the Kárahnjúkavirkjun dam was being built had active faults in the earth, while she was Minister of Industry and Commerce.

Geophysicist Grímur Björnsson revealed on the television news programme Kastljós that a report he had prepared, criticizing the placement of the Kárahnjúkar dam, had been stamped as confidential by his superior at the time. Minister of Industry Valgerður Sverrisdóttir had subsequently failed to reveal the details of the report to parliament, as she was obliged to do.

Valgerður Sverrisdóttir rejected all accusations, claiming the controversy was a last-ditch effort on behalf of the opposition to delay the flooding of the Hálslón Reservoir. The flooding of the reservoir, which was set to take place at the end of September of the same year, subsequently submerged a large section of the Icelandic highlands.

References

External links

1950 births
Living people
Valgerdur Sverrisdottir
Valgerdur Sverrisdottir
Valgerdur Sverrisdottir
Valgerdur Sverrisdottir
Valgerdur Sverrisdottir
Female foreign ministers
Valgerdur Sverrisdottir
Female defence ministers